The Diocese of Zacatecoluca is a Latin Church ecclesiastical territory or diocese of the Catholic Church in El Salvador. It is a suffragan diocese in the ecclesiastical province of the metropolitan Archdiocese of San Salvador. The Diocese of Zacatecoluca was erected on 5 May 1987.

Ordinaries
Romeo Tovar Astorga, O.F.M. (1987–1996), appointed Coadjutor Bishop of San Miguel
Elías Samuel Bolaños Avelar, S.D.B. (1998– )

External links and references

Zacatecoluca
Zacatecoluca
Zacatecoluca
Roman Catholic Ecclesiastical Province of San Salvador